Kronick is a surname. Notable people with the surname include:
David A. Kronick (1917–2006), American librarian
David C. Kronick (b. 1932), New Jersey politician
Maury Kaye (b. Morris Kronick) (1932–1983), Canadian jazz pianist
Richard Kronick, American medical professor
William Kronick (b. 1934), American filmmaker

See also
Kronic
Kronik